An asteroid family is a population of asteroids that share similar proper orbital elements, such as semimajor axis, eccentricity, and orbital inclination. The members of the families are thought to be fragments of past asteroid collisions.  An asteroid family is a more specific term than asteroid group whose members, while sharing some broad orbital characteristics, may be otherwise unrelated to each other.

General properties

Large prominent families contain several hundred recognized asteroids (and many more smaller objects which may be either not-yet-analyzed, or not-yet-discovered). Small, compact families may have only about ten identified members. About 33% to 35% of asteroids in the main belt are family members.

There are about 20 to 30 reliably recognized families, with several tens of less certain groupings. Most asteroid families are found in the main asteroid belt, although several family-like groups such as the Pallas family, Hungaria family, and the Phocaea family lie at smaller semi-major axis or larger inclination than the main belt.

One family has been identified associated with the dwarf planet . Some studies have tried to find evidence of collisional families among the trojan asteroids, but at present the evidence is inconclusive.

Origin and evolution
The families are thought to form as a result of collisions between asteroids. In many or most cases the parent body was shattered, but there are also several families which resulted from a large cratering event which did not disrupt the parent body (e.g. the Vesta, Pallas, Hygiea, and Massalia families). Such cratering families typically consist of a single large body and a swarm of asteroids that are much smaller. Some families (e.g. the Flora family) have complex internal structures which are not satisfactorily explained at the moment, but may be due to several collisions in the same region at different times.

Due to the method of origin, all the members have closely matching compositions for most families. Notable exceptions are those families (such as the Vesta family) which formed from a large differentiated parent body.

Asteroid families are thought to have lifetimes of the order of a billion years, depending on various factors (e.g. smaller asteroids are lost faster). This is significantly shorter than the Solar System's age, so few if any are relics of the early Solar System. Decay of families occurs both because of slow dissipation of the orbits due to perturbations from Jupiter or other large bodies, and because of collisions between asteroids which grind them down to small bodies. Such small asteroids then become subject to perturbations such as the Yarkovsky effect that can push them towards orbital resonances with Jupiter over time. Once there, they are relatively rapidly ejected from the asteroid belt. Tentative age estimates have been obtained for some families, ranging from hundreds of millions of years to less than several million years as for the compact Karin family. Old families are thought to contain few small members, and this is the basis of the age determinations.

It is supposed that many very old families have lost all the smaller and medium-sized members, leaving only a few of the largest intact. A suggested example of such old family remains are the 9 Metis and 113 Amalthea asteroid pair. Further evidence for a large number of past families (now dispersed) comes from analysis of chemical ratios in iron meteorites. These show that there must have once been at least 50 to 100 parent bodies large enough to be differentiated, that have since been shattered to expose their cores and produce the actual meteorites (Kelley & Gaffey 2000).

Identification of members, interlopers and background asteroids 

When the orbital elements of main belt asteroids are plotted (typically inclination vs. eccentricity, or vs. semi-major axis), a number of distinct concentrations are seen against the rather uniform distribution of non-family background asteroids. These concentrations are the asteroid families (see above). Interlopers are asteroids classified as family members based on their so-called proper orbital elements but having spectroscopic properties distinct from the bulk of the family, suggesting that they, contrary to the true family members, did not originate from the same parent body that once fragmented upon a collisional impact.

Description 

Strictly speaking, families and their membership are identified by analysing the proper orbital elements rather than the current osculating orbital elements, which regularly fluctuate on timescales of tens of thousands of years. The proper elements are related constants of motion that remain almost constant for at least tens of millions of years, and perhaps longer.

The Japanese astronomer Kiyotsugu Hirayama (1874–1943) pioneered the estimation of proper elements for asteroids, and first identified several of the most prominent families in 1918. In his honor, asteroid families are sometimes called Hirayama families. This particularly applies to the five prominent groupings discovered by him.

Hierarchical clustering method 

Present day computer-assisted searches have identified more than a hundred asteroid families. The most prominent algorithms have been the hierarchical clustering method (HCM), which looks for groupings with small nearest-neighbour distances in orbital element space, and wavelet analysis, which builds a density-of-asteroids map in orbital element space, and looks for density peaks.

The boundaries of the families are somewhat vague because at the edges they blend into the background density of asteroids in the main belt. For this reason the number of members even among discovered asteroids is usually only known approximately, and membership is uncertain for asteroids near the edges.

Additionally, some interlopers from the heterogeneous background asteroid population are expected even in the central regions of a family. Since the true family members caused by the collision are expected to have similar compositions, most such interlopers can in principle be recognised by spectral properties which do not match those of the bulk of family members. A prominent example is 1 Ceres, the largest asteroid, which is an interloper in the family once named after it (the Ceres family, now the Gefion family).

Spectral characteristics can also be used to determine the membership (or otherwise) of asteroids in the outer regions of a family, as has been used e.g. for the Vesta family, whose members have an unusual composition.

Family types

As previously mentioned, families caused by an impact that did not disrupt the parent body but only ejected fragments are called cratering families. Other terminology has been used to distinguish various types of groups which are less distinct or less statistically certain from the most prominent "nominal families" (or clusters).

Clusters, clumps, clans and tribes 

The term cluster is also used to describe a small asteroid family, such as the Karin cluster. Clumps are groupings which have relatively few members but are clearly distinct from the background (e.g. the Juno clump). Clans are groupings which merge very gradually into the background density and/or have a complex internal structure making it difficult to decide whether they are one complex group or several unrelated overlapping groups (e.g. the Flora family has been called a clan). Tribes are groups that are less certain to be statistically significant against the background either because of small density or large uncertainty in the orbital parameters of the members.

List

Prominent families 

Among the many asteroid families, the Eos, Eunomia, Flora, Hungaria, Hygiea, Koronis, Nysa, Themis and Vesta families are the most prominent ones in the asteroid belt. For a complete list, see .

 Eos family
The Eos family (adj. Eoan; 9,789 members, named after 221 Eos)  
Eunomia family
The Eunomia family (adj. Eunomian; 5,670 known members, named after 15 Eunomia) is a family of S-type asteroids. It is the most prominent family in the intermediate asteroid belt and the 6th-largest family with approximately 1.4% of all main belt asteroids.
Flora family
The Flora family (adj. Florian; 13,786 members, named after 8 Flora) is the 3rd-largest family. Broad in extent, it has no clear boundary and gradually fades into the surrounding background population. Several distinct groupings within the family, possibly created by later, secondary collisions. It has also been described as an asteroid clan. 
 Hungaria family
The Hungaria family (adj. Hungarian; 2,965 members, named after 434 Hungaria)  
Hygiea family
The Hygiea family (adj. Hygiean; 4,854 members, named after 10 Hygiea)
 Koronis family
The Koronis family (adj. Koronian; 5,949 members, named after 158 Koronis)
 Nysa family
The Nysa family (adj. Nysian; 19,073 members, named after 44 Nysa). Alternatively named  Hertha family after 135 Hertha.
 Themis family
The Themis family (adj. Themistian; 4,782 members, named after 24 Themis)
 Vesta family
The Vesta family (adj. Vestian; 15,252 members, named after 4 Vesta)

All families 

In 2015, a study identified 122 notable families with a total of approximately 100,000 member asteroids, based on the entire catalog of numbered minor planets, which consisted of almost 400,000 numbered bodies at the time (see catalog index for a current listing of numbered minor planets). The data has been made available at the "Small Bodies Data Ferret". The first column of this table contains the family identification number or family identifier number (FIN), which is an attempt for a numerical labeling of identified families, independent of their currently used name, as a family's name may change with refined observations, leading to multiple names used in literature and to subsequent confusion.

Other families or dynamical groups 

Other asteroid families from miscellaneous sources (not listed in the above table), as well as non-asteroid families include:

See also 
 Proper orbital elements
 :Category:Asteroid groups and families

Notes

References

Further reading 

 Bendjoya, Philippe; and Zappalà, Vincenzo; "Asteroid Family Identification", in Asteroids III, pp. 613–618, University of Arizona Press (2002), 
 V. Zappalà et al. "Physical and Dynamical Properties of Asteroid Families", in Asteroids III, pp. 619–631, University of Arizona Press (2002), 
 A. Cellino et al. "Spectroscopic Properties of Asteroid Families", in Asteroids III, pp. 633–643, University of Arizona Press (2002), 
 Hirayama, Kiyotsugu; "Groups of asteroids probably of common origin", Astronomical Journal, Vol. 31, No. 743, pp. 185-188 (October 1918).
 Nesvorný, David; Bottke Jr., William F.; Dones, Luke; and Levison, Harold F.; "The recent breakup of an asteroid in the main-belt region", Nature, Vol. 417, pp. 720-722 (June 2002).
 Zappalà, Vincenzo; Cellino, Alberto; Farinella, Paolo; and Knežević, Zoran; "Asteroid families I - Identification by hierarchical clustering and reliability assessment", Astronomical Journal, Vol. 100, p. 2030 (December 1990).
 Zappalà, Vincenzo; Cellino, Alberto; Farinella, Paolo; and Milani, Andrea; "Asteroid families II - Extension to unnumbered multiopposition asteroids", Astronomical Journal, Vol. 107, pp. 772-801 (February 1994)
 
 M. S. Kelley & M. J. Gaffey 9 Metis and 113 Amalthea: A Genetic Asteroid Pair, Icarus Vol. 144, p. 27 (2000).

External links 
 Planetary Data System - Asteroid Families dataset, as per the Zappalà 1995 analysis.
 Latest calculations of proper elements for numbered minor planets at astDys.
 Asteroid (and Comet) Groups  by Petr Scheirich (with excellent plots).
 Asteroid Families Portal

 
Families